Professor Michael Patrick Feneley AM is an Australian cardiologist.

Medical career
Feneley has been the Director of Cardiology at St Vincent's Hospital, Sydney, since 1993. Other positions include as Director, Heart Lung Program since 2004, chairman, St Vincent's Medical Council 2003–2008, a board member of St Vincent's and Mater Health Sydney 2003-2008 and Director, Physician Training for over 5 years.

Feneley's research altered the recommendations for the performance of manual cardiopulmonary resuscitation (CPR) and altered the management of patients with atrial fibrillation, the most common significant disturbance of heart rhythm.

Politics
Feneley stood as the Liberal Party candidate in the 2010 Australian federal election in the seat of Kingsford Smith. The seat has been held by Labor since it was created in 1949. He was defeated by the sitting Labor member and Environment Minister Peter Garrett, though he managed to slash eight points off the Labor margin, reducing it from a comfortably safe 63 percent to a marginal 55 percent.

Seven months later Feneley stood as the Liberal candidate in the 2011 New South Wales state election in the seat of Maroubra. As was the case previously, the seat has been held by Labor since it was created in 1950. He was defeated by Labor's Michael Daley, but slashed the Labor majority from a previously comfortably safe 16.1 percent to a marginal 1.6 percent. Daley was one of only 20 successful Labor candidates. Feneley ran as the Liberal candidate for Kingsford Smith in the 2013 election. He was defeated by Garrett's replacement as Labor candidate, former Senator Matt Thistlethwaite—in the process, paring the Labor margin down to just 2.7 percent.

Feneley recontested Kingsford Smith at the 2016 Federal election but was defeated in a rematch against Thistlewaite. This time, Thistlewaite picked up enough of a swing to revert Kingsford Smith to safe Labor.

Feneley was a candidate for Liberal preselection for the 2018 Wentworth by-election however he was defeated by Dave Sharma.

In 2022 Feneley won preselection for the marginal seat of Dobell on the NSW central coast for the 2022 Federal Election, but was unsuccessful.

Honours
On 11 June 2012, Feneley was named a Member of the Order of Australia for "service to medicine in the field of cardiology as a clinician, researcher and educator, through contributions to professional organisations, and to the community."

Personal life
Feneley is married to his second wife and has four children.

He served as president of the Art Gallery Society of New South Wales Council, the Art Gallery of New South Wales membership organisation, from 2006 to 2010. Prior to this he served as vice-president from 2005 to 2006 and has been a member since 2002.

He has also served as Chair of the East Coast Theatre Company for several years.

References

Year of birth missing (living people)
Place of birth missing (living people)
Living people
Australian cardiologists
Liberal Party of Australia
Members of the Order of Australia